Rodolfo Goulart Damaggio (born April 11, 1965)  is a Brazilian comic book artist, animator, concept artist and storyboard artist.

References

External links
Rodolfo Damaggio ArtStation
Rodolfo Damaggio biography on Lambiek
Rodolfo Damaggio at ComicBookDb.com

Brazilian comics artists
Brazilian animators
Brazilian storyboard artists
Brazilian speculative fiction artists
Science fiction artists